Jeondong station is a railway station in Jeondong-myeon, Sejong City, South Korea without passenger service.

Station 
After August 1, 2005, no passenger train stops. There are two platforms for two tracks with two passing tracks.

Railway stations in Sejong